Eugene Paul Malinowski (September 26, 1923 – November 24, 1993) was an American football player. 

Malinowski played college football for the University of Detroit Titans football team. He began his college football career as a center, but was switched to quarterback by Detroit head coach Chuck Baer.

He was selected by the Boston Yanks with the 67th pick in the 1947 NFL Draft. He appeared in 12 games, two as a starter, for the 1948 Boston team. Initially drafted as a center and linebacker, he was used by the Yanks as an offensive "T" quarterback. After the 1948 season, he was traded to the Detroit Lions.

References 

1923 births
1993 deaths
American football quarterbacks
Boston Yanks players
Detroit Titans football players
People from Hamtramck, Michigan
Players of American football from Michigan